George Frederick Haines (March 9, 1924 – May 1, 2006) was a swimmer and swimming coach who coached at the Santa Clara Swim Club, Stanford University and UCLA. He also coached for seven U.S. Olympic swim teams. He was inducted into the International Swimming Hall of Fame in 1977 as an Honor Coach.

Early life
Haines was born in Huntington, Indiana, and became interested in swimming after joining the local YMCA, where he won two YMCA championships. After moving to California, Haines attended college at San Jose State University, and in 1950, founded the Santa Clara Swim Club. It started out as a thirteen-member swim club located in the old Santa Clara High School. This club soon became a training ground for competitive swimmers from all over the United States. He coached for twenty-three years, leaving Santa Clara in 1973. During his stay at Santa Clara, he coached 26 future Olympians Mark Spitz, Don Schollander, Donna deVarona and Claudia Kolb.

Olympics
In 1960, Haines was selected to coach at the 1960 Summer Olympics, and seven of his swimmers from Santa Clara also qualified, including 1960 gold medalists Chris von Saltza, Lynn Burke, George Harrison, and Paul Hait; the first class also included Donna de Varona and Steve Clark, who would win gold at the 1964 Olympics. In the 1960s, multi-gold medalists Don Schollander and Mark Spitz joined Santa Clara to train with Haines prior to their success at the 1964, 1968, and 1972 Olympics.

College swimming
From 1974 to 1978, Haines coached the UCLA men's swimming team. In 1982, Haines became the women's swimming coach at Stanford University, coaching the team to an NCAA championship in 1983 as well as two second-places finishes and two third-place finishes.

Legacy
He left Santa Clara in 1973, and retired from coaching swimming in 1988. In 2001, Haines was going to have a grand reunion with some of the club's former champion swimmers. However, the reunion was postponed because he suffered a stroke, which incapacitated him for the rest of his life. He died in a nursing home in Carmichael, California on May 1, 2006. He was married for 60 years to June Carter Haines, and the couple had five children. A bronze statue of Haines now stands next to the Olympic-size pool at the Santa Clara Swim Center.

See also
 List of members of the International Swimming Hall of Fame

References

External links
 

1924 births
2006 deaths
American Olympic coaches
American swimming coaches
UCLA Bruins swimming coaches
People from Huntington, Indiana
Stanford Cardinal swimming coaches
San Jose State Spartans men's swimmers